Wakasugiyama may refer to:

Mount Wakasugi, mountain in Tottori Prefecture
Wakasugiyama (Fukuoka), mountain in Fukuoka Prefecture
Wakasugiyama Toyoichi, Japanese sumo wrestler